Salvarino Aliprandi (died 1344) was an Italian Legal Counsel of the 14th century.

Biography

Born in Monza in the late 13th century, he belonged to one of the most important families of Monza, but residing in Milan, he was son of Rebaldo, brother of Pinalla and Martino, Salvarino was Legal Counsel in the college of Milan and his name appears in the list of Milan, proponents of the Visconti, tried in the years 1322–1324. He died in 1344, was buried in the Church of San Marco in a coffin that has the deceased, kneeling at Christ the Judge, who welcomed him and blessing him behind his throne, two angels hold a cloth.

People from Monza
1344 deaths
14th-century Italian lawyers
Year of birth missing
People from Brianza
Italian Roman Catholics